Gisilia is a genus of moths in the family Cosmopterigidae.

Species
Gisilia alfieriella (Rebel, 1927)
Gisilia antidesma (Meyrick, 1913)
Gisilia cardinata (Meyrick, 1918)
Gisilia conformata (Meyrick, 1921)
Gisilia gielisi Koster, 2010
Gisilia lerautella Gibeaux, 1986
Gisilia meyi Sinev, 2007
Gisilia sclerodes (Meyrick, 1909)
Gisilia stagnans (Meyrick, 1921)
Gisilia stereodoxa (Meyrick, 1925)
Gisilia subcrocea Meyrick, 1923

References
Natural History Museum Lepidoptera genus database

Chrysopeleiinae
Moth genera